Dalcera abrasa is a moth in the family Dalceridae. It is found in Colombia, Venezuela, Guyana, Suriname, French Guiana, Brazil, Peru and Bolivia. The habitat consists of tropical wet, tropical moist, tropical dry, tropical premontane wet, tropical premontane moist, tropical lower montane moist, subtropical moist, subtropical lower montane moist, warm temperate moist and warm temperate dry forests.

The length of the forewings is 15–20 mm for males and 20–26 mm for females. The forewings are light dirty orange with a yellow costal margin and with dark fuscous at the base. The hindwings are yellow-orange with a white fringe. Adults are on wing year-round.

The larvae feed on Coffea arabica, Echinochloa polystachia, Eucalyptus robusta and Spondias purpurea.

References

Moths described in 1854
Dalceridae
Moths of South America